"Old Pop in an Oak" is a song recorded by Swedish band Rednex, released in 1994 as the second single from their debut album, Sex & Violins (1995). It reached number-one in many countries, including Austria, Belgium, Denmark, Finland, and Sweden. In the UK, it peaked at number 12.

Chart performance
Like its predecessor, "Pop in an Oak" was very successful on the charts in Europe, remaining one of the group's biggest hits to date. It peaked at number-one in Austria, Denmark, Finland, Norway and Sweden. Additionally, the single made it to the top 10 also in Belgium, Germany, Iceland, the Netherlands, Scotland and Switzerland, as well as on the Eurochart Hot 100, where it reached number two. In the United Kingdom, "Old Pop in an Oak" soared to number 12 in its first week at the UK Singles Chart, on March 19, 1995. In France, it was a top 50 hit. Outside Europe, the single peaked at number seven in New Zealand, number 17 on the RPM Dance/Urban chart and number 53 on the RPM Top Singles chart in Canada, and number 70 in Australia. It earned a gold record in Switzerland and a platinum record in Austria, Germany and Norway.

Critical reception
British newspaper Lennox Herald noted that "Old Pop in an Oak" is a "similar sounding song" to their previous single, "Cotton Eye Joe". A reviewer from Manila Standard described it as "techno-pop fun". Pan-European magazine Music & Media viewed it as a "C&W/dance mixture". Music Week constated that "Rednex regurgitate Cotton Eye Joe – give or take the odd twang – and set out to prove that successfully following up a novelty number one isn't impossible." James Hamilton from the magazine's RM Dance Update declared it as a "speak of the devil, another thumbs in braces, boot stompin', high steppin' moonshine swiggin' gingham swirling Swedish disco hoedown much too much like their last one". Also Chuck Campbell from Scripps Howard News Service deemed the song as a "very similar re-take" on the band's first hit.

Track listing
 CD maxi
"Old Pop in an Oak" (Original Radio Edit) – 3:30
"Old Pop in an Oak" (Doug's Klub Mix) – 5:25
"Old Pop in an Oak" (Original Extended Mix) – 5:38
"Old Pop in an Oak" (Doug's Phantom Dub Mix) – 3:50
"Old Pop in an Oak" (Original Instrumental) – 3:20

Charts

Weekly charts

Year-end charts

Certifications and sales

See also
List of number-one hits of 1995 (Austria)
List of number-one hits of 1995 (Denmark)
List of number-one singles of 1994 (Finland)
List of number-one singles and albums in Sweden
List of number-one songs in Norway
Ultratop 50 number-one hits of 1995

References

1994 singles
1994 songs
Rednex songs
Songs written by Pat Reiniz
Number-one singles in Austria
Number-one singles in Belgium
Number-one singles in Denmark
Number-one singles in Finland
Number-one singles in Norway
Number-one singles in Sweden
Music videos directed by Stefan Berg